Puzary  is a village in the administrative district of Gmina Szczytno, within Szczytno County, Warmian-Masurian Voivodeship, in northern Poland.

People 
 Kuno von der Goltz (1817–1897), prussian general

Weblinks

References

Puzary